Poe Kyar Phyu Khin (born 3 December 1992) is a Burmese television actress. She gained popularity among the audiences after starring her role as Seng Mai in MRTV-4 television series Moe Kaung Kin Eain Met (2018).

Early life and education
Poe Kyar Phyu Khin was on 3 December 1992 in Yangon, Myanmar. She is eldest of two siblings. She attended high school at Basic Education High School No. 4 Botataung. She graduated from Dagon University.

Career
She started her career from attending at Stars & Models Int'l in 2014. In 2015, she starred in her debut MRTV-4 thriller-drama series Wingabar San Eain alongside Aung Min Khant, Hsaung Wutyee May, Aung Yay Chan, Myat Thu Thu and Phone Shein Khant. In 2016, she starred in comedy-drama series Ma Ma Htake and Heritage House alongside Khine Thin Kyi, Hein Htet, Mone, May Akari Htoo and Hsu Waddy. In 2017, she starred in drama series Oo Yin Mhu Phit Phu Chin The alongside Kyaw Hsu, Hein Htet (actor) and Khay Sett Thwin.

In 2018, she starred in drama series Moe Kaung Kin Eain Met alongside Si Thu Win and Kyaw Htet Zaw. In 2019, she starred in drama series Kyal Kalay Yae Kaung Kin alongside Khant Si Thu and Kyaw Htet Zaw.

Filmography
Television seriesWinkabar San Eain (2015)Ma Ma Htake and Heritage House (2016)Oo Yin Mhu Phit Phu Chin The  (2017)Moe Kaung Kin Eain Met (2018)Kyal Kalay Yae Kaung Kin (2019)Mar Yar Hlae Kwat (2020)Kwat Lat Ma Shi (2022)

Discography
SinglesYou are My Life with Sein Lin (2019) Moe Lay Phwae Tone'' with Sein Lin (2019)

References

External links

Living people
1992 births
21st-century Burmese actresses
People from Yangon